The Metuchen School District is a comprehensive community public school district that serves students in pre-kindergarten through twelfth grade from Metuchen, in Middlesex County, New Jersey, United States.

As of the 2019–20 school year, the district, comprised of four schools, had an enrollment of 2,300 students and 182.2 classroom teachers (on an FTE basis), for a student–teacher ratio of 12.6:1.

The district is classified by the New Jersey Department of Education as being in District Factor Group "I", the second-highest of eight groupings. District Factor Groups organize districts statewide to allow comparison by common socioeconomic characteristics of the local districts. From lowest socioeconomic status to highest, the categories are A, B, CD, DE, FG, GH, I and J.

Awards and recognition
NAMM named the district in its 2008 survey of the "Best Communities for Music Education", which included 110 school districts nationwide. The district was also included in NAMM's 2009 survey of the "Best Communities for Music Education", which included 124 school districts nationwide.

Schools
Schools in the district (with 2019–20 enrollment data from the National Center for Education Statistics) are:

Kindergarten 
Mildred B. Moss Elementary School with 122 students in Pre-kindergarten and kindergarten
Richard Cohen, Principal
Elementary school
Campbell Elementary School with 702 students in grades 1-4
Dr. Vincent Constanza, Principal
Middle school
Edgar Middle School with 722 students in grades 5-8
Suzy Azevedo, Principal
High school
Metuchen High School with 729 students in grades 9-12
Edward Porowski, Principal

Administration
Core members of the district's administration are:
Vincent Caputo, Superintendent 
Michael A. Harvier, Business Administrator / Board Secretary

Board of education
The district's board of education is comprised of nine members who set policy and oversee the fiscal and educational operation of the district through its administration. As a Type II school district, the board's trustees are elected directly by voters to serve three-year terms of office on a staggered basis, with three seats up for election each year held (since 2014) as part of the November general election. The board appoints a superintendent to oversee the day-to-day operation of the district.

References

External links
Metuchen School District
 
School Data for the Metuchen School District, National Center for Education Statistics

Metuchen, New Jersey
New Jersey District Factor Group I
School districts in Middlesex County, New Jersey